Enzo Salvi (born Vincenzo Salvi; 16 August 1963 in Rome, Italy) is an Italian actor.

His most popular character is nicknamed Er Cipolla (The Onion in Romanesco dialect).

Filmography

Films
 Vacanze di Natale 2000 (1999)
 Body Guards (2000)
 Merry Christmas (2001)
 Natale sul Nilo (2002)
 Natale in India (2003)
 Le barzellette (2004)
 Il ritorno del Monnezza (2005)
 Notte prima degli esami (2006)
 Olé (2006)
 Notte prima degli esami – Oggi (2007)
 2061: An Exceptional Year (2007)
 Matrimonio alle Bahamas (2007)
 Ultimi della classe (2008) Voice
 Un'estate al mare (2008)
 La fidanzata di papà (2008)
 Many Kisses Later (2009)
 A Natale mi sposo (2010)
 Women vs. Men (2011)
 Una cella in due (2011)
 Box Office 3D: The Filmest of Films (2011)
 Wedding in Paris (2011)
 Love Is in the Air (2012)
 Operazione vacanze (2012)
 Io che amo solo te (2015)
 The Veil of Maya (2017)
 Natale da chef (2017)
 Lockdown all'italiana (2020)

TV series
2006 – Domani è un'altra truffa
2007 – Di che peccato sei?
2009 – Piper
2010 - Fratelli Benvenuti
2010 – SMS - Squadra molto speciale
2011 – Notte prima degli esami '82
2012 – Punto su di te

Theatre
1993 – Seduti e abbandonati
1995 – Scene da un manicomio
1995 – Cesare contro Cesare
1996 – Arrivano i Buffi!
1997 – Fermata obbligatoria
2003 – A qualcuno piace Carlo

References

External links 

20th-century Italian male actors
Male actors from Rome
1963 births
Living people
21st-century Italian male actors
Italian male film actors
Italian male stage actors
Italian male television actors